The Year of the Horse is a VHS released by singer-songwriter Sinéad O'Connor in 1991. The concert was recorded live at Forest National, Brussels (Belgium), on 29 October 1990 and Ahoy Sport Paleis, Rotterdam (Netherlands), on 30 October 1990. The concert was re-released in 2004 in DVD format as Live: The Year of the Horse/The Value of Ignorance.

Track listing

Credits
Sinéad O'Connor – vocals, guitar
Dean Garcia – bass
David Ruffy – drums
Marco Pirroni – guitar
Susan Davies – keyboards, guitar, backing vocals
Marc Taylor – keyboards

Directed by Sophie Muller.

References

1991 video albums
1990s English-language films
Sinéad O'Connor albums